John V of Alexandria may refer to:

 John the Merciful, Greek Patriarch of Alexandria in 610–619
 Pope John V of Alexandria, ruled in 1147–1166